Tiago Cardoso dos Santos (born 8 May 1984), known as Tiago Cardoso, is a former Brazilian footballer who played as a goalkeeper.

Club career
In February 2009 he left for ABC Futebol Clube, as a second keeper behind Raniere and ahead of Wellington. The club also sold Aloísio soon after. Cardoso then took the first choice spot at the start of 2009 Campeonato Brasileiro Série B and competed for the starting spot with Raniere and new signing Paulo Musse during the season. Cardoso won the race in mid-season. Overall, he played 16 times in the national league with the relegated team.

In December 2009, he left for Monte Azul for the 2010 Campeonato Paulista Serie A1.

Honours
Atlético Paranaense
Campeonato Paranaense: 2005

Fortaleza
Campeonato Cearense: 2007, 2008

Santa Cruz
Campeonato Pernambucano: 2011, 2012, 2013, 2015, 2016
Campeonato Brasileiro Série C: 2013
Copa do Nordeste: 2016

References

External links
 CBF 
 rubronegro.net 
 Futpedia Profile 
 

1984 births
Living people
Sportspeople from Piauí
Brazilian footballers
Association football goalkeepers
Campeonato Brasileiro Série A players
Campeonato Brasileiro Série B players
Campeonato Brasileiro Série C players
Ceará Sporting Club players
Club Athletico Paranaense players
Fortaleza Esporte Clube players
ABC Futebol Clube players
Clube Náutico Capibaribe players
Botafogo Futebol Clube (SP) players
Goiás Esporte Clube players
Mirassol Futebol Clube players